The voiced palatal approximant, or yod, is a type of consonant used in many spoken languages.

The palatal approximant can often be considered the semivocalic equivalent of the close front unrounded vowel .

An example is Spanish, which distinguishes two palatal approximants: an approximant semivowel , which is always unrounded, and an unspecified for rounding approximant consonant . Eugenio Martínez Celdrán describes the difference between them as follows (with audio examples added):

I think that the former is a real consonant, whereas the latter is a semi-consonant, as it has traditionally been called in Spanish, or a semi-vowel, if preferred. The IPA, though, classifies it as a consonant."

There is a parallel problem with transcribing the voiced velar approximant.

The symbol  may not display properly in all browsers. In that case,  should be substituted.

In the writing systems used for most languages in Central, Northern, and Eastern Europe, the letter j denotes the palatal approximant, as in German  'year', which is followed by IPA. Although it may be seen as counterintuitive for English-speakers, there are a few words with that orthographical spelling in certain loanwords in English like Hebrew "hallelujah" and German "Jägermeister".

There is also the post-palatal approximant in some languages, which is articulated slightly more back than the place of articulation of the prototypical palatal approximant but less far back than the prototypical velar approximant. The equivalent X-SAMPA symbols are j_- and M\_+, respectively. Other possible transcriptions include a centralized  ( in the IPA, j_" in X-SAMPA), a centralized  ( in the IPA, M\_" in X-SAMPA) and a non-syllabic  ( in the IPA, 1_^ in X-SAMPA).

The equivalent X-SAMPA symbols are j\_o_- and G_o_+.

Features
Features of the voiced palatal approximant:

 The most common type of this approximant is glide or semivowel. The term semivowel emphasizes that, although the sound is vocalic in nature, it is not 'syllabic' (it does not form the nucleus of a syllable). For a description of the approximant consonant variant used e.g. in Spanish, see above.
 The otherwise identical post-palatal variant is articulated slightly behind the hard palate, making it sound slightly closer to the velar .

Occurrence

Palatal

Post-palatal

See also
 Palatal lateral approximant
 Nasal palatal approximant
 Index of phonetics articles

Notes

References

External links
 

Palatal consonants
Oral consonants
Central consonants
Pulmonic consonants